"I Wanna Be Your Slave" (stylized in all caps) is a song by Italian rock band Måneskin, from their second studio album, Teatro d'ira: Vol. I released on 19 March 2021 by Sony. Prior to its release as a single, the song managed to reach top-ten positions on charts across Europe, including number one in Finland and Slovakia, and went viral on the Spotify charts. It is the band's first song to reach the top 5 of the UK Singles Chart, and second to reach top 10 of Billboard Global Excl. U.S. chart.

On 16 July 2021, the song was issued to Italian radio stations as the third single from Teatro d'ira: Vol. I. A duet version featuring American punk-rock singer Iggy Pop was released on 6 August 2021.

Background and composition
The song talks about duality in love relationships, the "obsession and how they're willing to enslave themselves if that's what it takes to win over that special someone." According to lyricist Damiano David, the song "crudely describes all the facets of sexuality and how they can be influential in everyday life. We have inserted some contrasts: 'I'm the devil, I'm a lawyer, I'm a killer, I'm a blonde girl', we want to convey the idea that we don't need to have a single identity, everyone can have many facets."

Music video
 
On 5 July 2021, the band announced an official music video, which was released on their YouTube channel on 15 July. It was directed by Simone Bozzelli and produced by Think|Cattleya. It presents "voyeuristic loop", where "forbidden desires are matched with sacrifice." The video won the Best Alternative category at the 2022 MTV Video Music Awards.

Commercial performance
After the band's win at the Eurovision Song Contest 2021, "I Wanna Be Your Slave" became viral on weekly charts and Spotify charts, in part thanks to their live performance recorded at the Acquapendente studio, where the band recorded their studio album Teatro d'ira: Vol. I, and shared for the Wiwi Jam At Home concert hosted by Wiwibloggs. First peaking at number 12 on the UK Singles Chart, the song surpassed the peak of the band's previous single "Zitti e buoni" (number 17), thus making Måneskin the first Eurovision-winning act since Celine Dion to have two songs in the UK top 40. On 15 June 2021, the song peaked at number one on the UK's Official Trending Chart and gained four positions on the midweek singles chart passing from number 12 to number 8, peaking at number 7 on the weekly chart, becoming the band's first song to reach the UK top 10. In the next week it advanced to number 6. In its sixth charting week it became the band's first UK top 5 hit.

The song reached number one in Finland and Slovakia, and also reached the top 10 in the band's native country of Italy as well as in Austria, Czech Republic, Denmark, Germany, Greece, Ireland, Lithuania, Netherlands, New Zealand, Norway, Sweden and Switzerland. By 15 June 2021, the song was streamed 5.8 million times in the UK across both audio and video plays, and more than 61 million times on Spotify. On 21 June, the song became the band's second song to reach top 10 of the Billboard Global Excl. U.S. chart. It topped the Billboard's US Hot Hard Rock Songs chart week of 26 June 2021.

The song was certified triple platinum in Italy, double platinum in Austria and Sweden, platinum in Australia, Canada, Germany, Greece, Norway, Poland, Portugal and the United Kingdom, and gold in Denmark, France, Spain and the United States.

Charts

Weekly charts

Year-end charts

Certifications

Release history

Footnotes

References

2021 songs
2021 singles
English-language Italian songs
Hard rock songs
Iggy Pop songs
Måneskin songs
Number-one singles in Finland
Sony Music singles
Songs written by Damiano David
Songs written by Victoria De Angelis